Cho Sung-hoon may refer to:
 Cho Sung-hoon (skier)
 Cho Sung-hoon (footballer)